Portobello GAA is a Gaelic Athletic Association club based in the Rathmines area of the south side of Dublin in Ireland. The club has adult men's football, hurling, camogie, ladies' Gaelic football and handball teams.

The football team plays at Leinster Road, while the camogie team plays at Phoenix Park.

Liz Howard, former president of the Camogie Association, was a member of the club from 2006 onwards.

Honours
Leinster Ladies' Senior Club Football Championship (1) 1998
Dublin Ladies' Senior Football Championship (6) 1992, 1995, 1996, 1997, 1998, 1999
Dublin Junior H Hurling Championship (1) 2021
All-Ireland Softball (60X30) Silver Masters Doubles 2007 (Seamus O'Mahony of Portobello, along with Frank Semple)

References

External links
Official website
A fantastic four months in Dublin Handball, Hogan Stand, 24 April 2007

Gaelic games clubs in Dublin (city)
Gaelic football clubs in Dublin (city)
Rathmines